D20, D-20 or d20 may refer to:

Arts, entertainment, and media
 d20, a polyhedral die commonly used in role-playing games
 d20 System, a role-playing game system published by Wizards of the Coast
 Arriflex D-20, a film-style digital high definition movie camera 
 D-20, a version of the Roland D-50 synthesizer
 Dimension 20, a tabletop role-playing game show made by CollegeHumor
 Queen's Gambit Accepted, Encyclopaedia of Chess Openings code

Military
 152 mm towed gun-howitzer M1955 (D-20), a Soviet artillery piece
 , a destroyer that served with the Argentine Navy between 1961 and 1982
 , a destroyer escort that served with the Brazilian Navy between 1944 and 1975
 , a destroyer that served with the Royal Hellenic Navy between 1951 and 1972
 , a Royal Navy guided missile destroyer launched in 1964 and decommissioned in 1987

Science
 D20, a diffractometer located at Institut Laue–Langevin used in neutron research
 Heavy water, or deuterium oxide (D2O or 2H2O)

Vehicles and transport
 D20 road (Croatia), a state road
 Aero Synergie Jodel D20, a French ultralight
 Chevrolet D-20, a pick-up truck made in Brazil and Argentina
 LNER D20, a class of British steam locomotives
 Senova D20, a subcompact car made by SAIC in China 
 Soloviev D-20, a Soviet turbofan engine

Other
 Dublin 20, a Dublin, Ireland postal district
 2020 Democratic National Convention, American political convention, branded as "D20"